Huhu Rural LLG is a local-level government (LLG) of Milne Bay Province, Papua New Guinea.

Wards
01. Mutu'uwa
02. Divinai
03. Daio
04. Rabe
05. Ianeianene
06. Siasiada
07. Gibara
08. Lamhaga
09. Lelehudi
10. Watunou
11. Nigila
12. Ahioma
13. Waema
14. Gabugabuna
15. Maiwara
16. Naura
17. Gelamalaia
18. Gamadoudou
19. Wagawaga
20. Gwavili
21. Upper Dawadawa
22. Bubuleta
23. Walalaia
24. Bou
25. Ipouli
26. Kilakilana
27. Borowai
28. Laviam
29. Lower Dawadawa
85. Hagita Estate

References

Local-level governments of Milne Bay Province